Palaiochori (Greek: Παλαιοχώρι meaning "old town") may refer to several places in Greece:

Palaiochori, Arcadia, a village in Arcadia, part of the municipal unit Leonidio
Palaiochori, Chalkidiki, a village in Chalkidiki, part of the municipality Aristotelis
Palaiochori, Elis, a village in Elis, part of the municipality Pineios
Palaiochori, Evrytania, a village in Evrytania, part of the municipal unit Fragkista
Palaiochori, Grevena, a village in the Grevena regional unit, part of the municipality Grevena
Palaiochori Botsari, a village in the Ioannina regional unit, part of the municipal unit Lakka Souliou
Palaiochori Sirakou, a village in the Ioannina regional unit, part of the municipality North Tzoumerka
Palaiochori, Athamanes, a village in the Karditsa regional unit, part of the municipal unit Anatoliki Argithea 
Palaiochori, Mouzaki, a village in the Karditsa regional unit, part of the municipal unit Pamisos
Palaiochori, Kavala, a village in the Kavala regional unit, part of the municipality Pangaio
Palaiochori, Lesbos, a village on Lesbos Island, part of the municipal unit Plomari
Palaiochori Dorieon, a village in Phthiotis, part of the municipal unit Amfikleia
Palaiochori Tymfristou, a village in Phthiotis, part of the municipal unit Spercheiada
Palaiochori, Thesprotia, a village in Thesprotia, part of the municipality Filiates
Palaiochori, Trikala, a village in the Trikala regional unit, part of the municipal unit Kleino